The Allegheny River Valley Trail is a  rail trail in Cattaraugus county in western New York. It was built on portions of the former Western New York and Pennsylvania Railway. It has two "loops" the main loop that crosses through Gargoyle Park, West State Street, Constitution Ave, as well as Saint Bonaventure University. There is a shorter alternative loop called the Saint Francis Loop which is 2.6 miles, loops around Saint Bonaventure's campus.

References

External links 
 Allegheny River Valley Trail - Town of Allegany

Protected areas of Allegany County, New York
Parks in Cattaraugus County, New York